Matt Mangene (born March 12, 1989) is an American professional ice hockey forward who is currently playing with EC VSV of the Austrian Hockey League (IceHL).

Playing career
Prior to turning professional, Mangene attended the University of Maine where he played three seasons (2009–12) of NCAA college hockey with the Maine Black Bears.

On April 2, 2012, the Philadelphia Flyers of the National Hockey League signed Mangene as a free agent to a two-year entry level contract, and he was assigned to begin his professional career with the Adirondack Phantoms of the AHL for the remaining games of the  2011–12 season.

After three seasons in the Flyers minor league system, Mangene was traded to the New York Islanders along with a second and third-round draft pick for Andrew MacDonald on March 4, 2014.  Mangene was initially assigned to the Bridgeport Sound Tigers, the Islanders' AHL affiliate.  After going scoreless in 10 games, Mangene was reassigned to the Islanders' ECHL team, the Stockton Thunder.  Following the end of the season, the Islanders did not make a qualifying offer to Mangene and he became an unrestricted agent on July 1, 2014.

On September 25, 2014, Mangene returned to the ECHL in signing a one-year contract with the Florida Everblades.

After establishing himself in the AHL in playing four seasons with the Texas Stars, Mangene left as a free agent following the 2017–18 season to sign a one-year contract with fellow AHL competitors, the Springfield Thunderbirds, affiliate of the Florida Panthers on July 3, 2018.

Following his ninth season in the AHL, Mangene opted to pursue a career abroad, agreeing to a one-year contract with Austrian club, EC VSV of the Ice Hockey League on August 19, 2020.

Career statistics

References

External links

1989 births
Living people
Adirondack Phantoms players
American men's ice hockey centers
Bridgeport Sound Tigers players
Florida Everblades players
Ice hockey players from New York (state)
Maine Black Bears men's ice hockey players
People from Suffolk County, New York
Springfield Thunderbirds players
Stockton Thunder players
Texas Stars players
Trenton Titans players